The Jizzakh clan is a political clan based in Jizzakh Province, Uzbekistan and allied with the Samarqand clan. It is led by Abdulaziz Kamilov, former Uzbek President Islam Karimov's presidential advisor and current Foreign Minister.

See also 
 Clans in Central Asia
 Tashkent clan
 Samarkand clan

References 

Ethnic groups in Uzbekistan
Politics of Uzbekistan
Political organisations based in Uzbekistan
Central Asia
Clans